SWGR may refer to:
Single wire ground return
Seagraves, Whiteface and Lubbock Railroad
Switchgear